Pseudodirphia varioides is a species of moth in the family Saturniidae first described by Ronald Brechlin in 2018. It is native to Bolivia.

References

Hemileucinae
Insects of Bolivia